Hednesford railway station serves the town of Hednesford in Staffordshire, England. The station, and all trains serving it, are operated by West Midlands Railway.

History
It closed to passengers on 18 January 1965 and to goods traffic on 6 September the same year as a result of the Beeching Axe, though the line that passed through remained in use for goods & mineral traffic, serving the power station at Rugeley and various local collieries.

The station reopened in 1989 by British Rail, as the terminus of the first stage of the reopening of the Chase Line from Walsall to passenger trains. At first, there was just a single platform (the current Walsall-bound one); however when services were extended to Rugeley Town in 1997, a second platform was added.

There is no ticket office so the Penalty fare scheme operates at the station, and passengers must buy a ticket or permit to travel from the machines at the station to avoid paying the £20 surcharge.

Hednesford is the only station not located in the West Midlands to be part of the West Midlands Trains free travel zone, situated in Zone 5 of the West Midlands railway network. It has been in place since the introduction of the scheme but is the only station to operate this scheme as Cannock, Landywood and Rugeley do not operate in the same zone.

Transport
Rail frequencies vary. On weekdays there are typically two trains per hour to Walsall and Birmingham at peak times and one train per hour during the off peak period and in the evenings. There are two trains per hour throughout the day on Saturdays with an hourly evening service. Trains operate between Birmingham New Street and Rugeley Trent Valley where connections to Stafford, Stoke-on-Trent and Crewe are available.

On Sundays there is an hourly service throughout the day after 10:00. Most services are operated by Class 350 electric trains and journey times are typically 21 minutes to Walsall and 45 minutes to Birmingham New Street. A small number of services to/from London Euston, Birmingham New Street or Walsall start or terminate here.

Hednesford no longer has a bus station, although there is an interchange on Victoria Street acting as a hub to locations such as Cannock, Rugeley, Lichfield and Pye Green. All services are run by Chaserider. No buses operate on Sunday and bank holiday.

References

External links

Hednesford
Railway stations in Staffordshire
DfT Category F1 stations
Former London and North Western Railway stations
Railway stations in Great Britain opened in 1859
Railway stations in Great Britain closed in 1965
Railway stations in Great Britain opened in 1989
Railway stations served by West Midlands Trains
Beeching closures in England
1859 establishments in England
1989 establishments in England
Reopened railway stations in Great Britain